WestCity Waitakere is a major regional shopping centre located in Henderson, a suburb in Auckland, New Zealand.

The centre has a current catchment area of 174,340 persons, and annual turnover at the centre for 2006 was $161.10 million NZD with 8.5 million visitors per year.

In February 2017, it was announced that owner Scentre Group had sold the mall, at the time named Westfield WestCity, to the family-owned Australian business Angaet Group for $147 million AUD.

History and development
The shopping centre had its origins in the 1960s, when the Henderson Borough Council established it, with the first stage opened in 1968, with a Woolworth's store as the main tenant. The second and third stages followed by 1970, and by 1974 the centre rivalled LynnMall in size. In 1997, St Lukes Group redeveloped the centre and renamed it WestCity Shopping Centre, a name Westfield kept (plus the standardised 'Westfield' prefix) after purchase of the property. In 2000, Westfield began a 16-month, $80 million redevelopment program. The result was the first "Street" entertainment and leisure precinct in New Zealand, launched at WestCity in July 2001.

In a 2008 rating of New Zealand shopping centres by a RCG Retail, a retail expert group, Westfield WestCity received three out of four stars based on the criteria of amount of shopping area, economic performance, amenity and appeal as well as future growth prospects. The centre was renamed WestCity Waitakere after its sale to Angaet Group in 2017.

Transport
The mall is accessible via the adjacent Henderson railway station and multiple AT Metro bus services. It has a taxi stand on Railside Avenue and bike stands located around the mall.

Facilities
WestCity Waitakere has 130 stores across three floors, including an Event Cinemas cinema, a Countdown supermarket and The Warehouse. It also has a multistorey car park with 1,492 spaces and a children's play area.

See also
 List of shopping centres in New Zealand

References

External links
WestCity Waitakere website

Shopping centres in the Auckland Region
Shopping malls established in 1974
Henderson-Massey Local Board Area
1970s architecture in New Zealand
West Auckland, New Zealand